Sushmitha Ravi known as Kushee Ravi is an Indian actress who works in Kannada-language films.Ravi made her debut with the film Dia in year 2020.

Early life
Sushmitha Ravi, known as Kushee Ravi as her screen name is born in Bangalore. She has made her graduation in SSMRV College, Bangalore.

Career
Kushee Ravi made here debut through a Kannada film Dia (2020) which gave her good recognition in the film industry. After the success of the film, she signed to appear in the horror film Spooky College and Nakshe but both of the films were delayed. During this time, she worked in short films and a Tamil-language single titled "Adipoli", which was well received. Spooky College released in 2023.

Filmography

Music videos

Awards
 2021 - Chandanavana Film Critics Acadamy Award for Best Actor (Female) - Dia

References

 Living people
 Actresses from Bangalore
 People from Bangalore
 Actresses in Kannada cinema
 Indian film actresses
21st-century Indian actresses
Year of birth missing (living people)